John Henderson (2 May 1807 – 4 April 1884) was an English businessman and  Liberal politician who sat in the House of Commons from 1864 to 1874.

Henderson was the son of Gilbert Henderson of Durham, and his wife Ann Robinson. He was educated at the Grammar School, Durham. He was a carpet manufacturer and coal owner. He was a Deputy Lieutenant and J.P. for County Durham
 
Henderson was elected as a Member of Parliament (MP) for City of Durham at a by-election in 1864. He held the seat until 1874.

Henderson married  Hannah Chipchase, daughter of Alderman Thomas Chipchase, of Durham in 1840.

References

External links

1811 births
1884 deaths
Liberal Party (UK) MPs for English constituencies
UK MPs 1859–1865
UK MPs 1865–1868
UK MPs 1868–1874
UK MPs 1874–1880
Deputy Lieutenants of Durham
People educated at Durham School
Members of the Parliament of the United Kingdom for City of Durham